Thydonos was a town of ancient Caria, mentioned by Pliny the Elder. Thydonos was a member of the Delian League since it appears in tribute records of Athens for 451/0 BCE.
 
Its site is unlocated, but Pliny's recitation of Thydonos among Euromus, Heraclea, Amyzon, and Alabanda, indicates that it was in the northern part of Caria.

References

Populated places in ancient Caria
Former populated places in Turkey
Members of the Delian League
Lost ancient cities and towns